Dr Pepper/Seven Up, Inc. (DPSU, or Dr Pepper 7UP, Inc.) was a Plano, Texas–based soft-drink manufacturing company created by the merger of Dr Pepper, Inc. and The 7 Up Company on May 19, 1986.  The merger was a result of the independent bailouts of both companies and the subsequent Federal Trade Commission blockage of a Dr Pepper merger with Coca-Cola.  The DPSU merger resulted in the breakup of international 
branding rights held by the two independent companies.

Dr Pepper/Seven Up, Inc. was purchased by Cadbury Schweppes plc and the Carlyle Group on March 2, 1995 after the conglomerate became debt-ridden and insolvent. It sold for about US$1.7 billion, plus about US$870 million of Dr Pepper/Seven-Up debt. This made Cadbury Schweppes the largest soft drink company in the world not to be named after a cola beverage.

In early 2006, Cadbury Schweppes purchased the remainder of Dr Pepper/Seven Up, Inc. and Dr Pepper/Seven Up Bottling Group from The Carlyle Group. All Dr Pepper/Seven Up, Inc. assets were absorbed into Cadbury Schweppes Americas Beverages, which included Mott's Beverages and Snapple Beverages. Dr Pepper/Seven Up Bottling Group was merged with other Cadbury-acquired bottlers and renamed Cadbury Schweppes Bottling Group.

In May 2008, Cadbury Schweppes spun off Cadbury Schweppes Americas Beverages into an independent company called the Dr Pepper Snapple Group, and renamed itself to Cadbury plc. Dr Pepper/Seven Up still exists as a trademark and brand name as of 2020.

On July 9, 2018, Keurig acquired the Dr Pepper Snapple Group in an $18.7 billion deal. The combined company was renamed Keurig Dr Pepper, and began trading publicly again on the New York Stock Exchange under the ticker "KDP". Shareholders of Dr Pepper Snapple Group own 13% of the combined company, with Keurig shareholder and Cadbury current owner Mondelez International owning 13% to 14% of that fraction. JAB Holdings owns the remaining, majority, stake.

References

External links 

 Dr Pepper/Seven Up (Archive)
 Dr Pepper website
 7 UP website

Food and drink companies established in 1986
Food and drink companies disestablished in 2006
Keurig Dr Pepper
Companies based in Plano, Texas
1986 establishments in Texas
2006 disestablishments in Texas
Defunct companies based in Texas
Food and drink companies based in Texas